"My Baby Loves Me" is a 1966 soul standard by Martha Reeves but released under Martha and The Vandellas. None of the Vandellas are featured in this song. Instead, the background is sung by Motown's session group, The Andantes, and another legendary Motown group, The Four Tops. Co-written (with Sylvia Moy) and co-produced by William "Mickey" Stevenson & Ivy Jo Hunter, the song rose to #22 on Billboard Hot 100 singles chart and #3 on Billboard's Hot R&B singles chart.

Background
The song has the narrator sing of her lover and how much he loves and needs her. Reeves often refers to it as her favorite of all of her recordings. While it didn't appear on her group's regular studio albums, it would be put on their Greatest Hits album.

Cash Box described it as a "moody, medium-paced bluesy romancer about real lucky gal who seems to have an ideal relationship with her boyfriend."

Personnel
Lead vocals by Martha Reeves
Background vocals by The Andantes and The Four Tops
Written by William "Mickey" Stevenson, Ivy Jo Hunter and Sylvia Moy
Produced by William "Mickey" Stevenson and Ivy Jo Hunter
Instrumentation by The Funk Brothers

Chart performance

References

1966 singles
Martha and the Vandellas songs
Songs written by Sylvia Moy
Songs written by William "Mickey" Stevenson
Song recordings produced by William "Mickey" Stevenson
Songs written by Ivy Jo Hunter
1966 songs
Gordy Records singles